Cyclops is one of the most common genera of freshwater copepods, comprising over 400 species.  Together with other similar-sized non-copepod fresh-water crustaceans, especially cladocera, they are commonly called water fleas.  The name Cyclops comes from the Cyclops of Greek mythology, as they have a single large eye; in Cyclops, the eye may be either red or black.

Anatomy 
Cyclops individuals may range from ½–5 mm long and are clearly divided into two sections. The broadly oval front section comprises the head and the first five thoracic segments. The hind part is considerably slimmer and is made up of the sixth thoracic segment and the four legless pleonic segments. Two caudal appendages project from the rear. Although they may be difficult to observe, Cyclops has 5 pairs of legs. The long first antennae, 2 in number, are used by the males for gripping the females during mating. Afterwards, the female carries the eggs in two small sacs on her body. The larvae, or nauplii, are free-swimming and unsegmented.

Habitat 
Cyclops has a cosmopolitan distribution in fresh water, but is less frequent in brackish water. It lives along the plant-covered banks of stagnant and slow-flowing bodies of water, where it feeds on small fragments of plant material, animals (such as nematodes), or carrion. It swims with characteristic jerky movements.  Cyclops has the capacity to survive unsuitable conditions by forming a cloak of slime. Average lifespan is about 3 months.

Public health importance 
Cyclops is intermediate host of dracunculiasis (guinea-worm disease) and fish tapeworm (Diphyllobothrium latum) infection. This disease can be passed to humans through drinking infected water. Dracunculiasis will rarely cause death but is  a weakening disease.

Control methods
Cyclops can be controlled using physical, chemical, biological and engineering methods.

Physical 
Straining of water through piece of fine cloth is sufficient to remove Cyclops. It can also be killed by boiling water, as it is easily killed by heat at 60 °C.

Chemical 
Chlorine in strength of 22 ppm destroys Cyclops in 2 hours; although this concentration of chlorine gives bad odour and taste to water. Excess chlorine can be removed with Sodium thiosulfate. Calcium hydroxide at dosage of 4 gram per gallon of water can be used. Temefos kills cyclops at concentration of 1 mg/litre.

Biological 
Small fish like barbel and Gambusia feed on Cyclops. This type of predation was used in Indian state of Karnataka to eradicate dracunculiasis.

Engineering 
Provision of drinking water through piping water supply, use of tubewells and abolition of stepwells are effective measures on community level.

Species

Cyclops abnobensis Brehm, 1958
Cyclops abyssicola Lilljeborg, 1901
Cyclops abyssorum G. O. Sars, 1863
Cyclops acanthoides Douwe, 1914
Cyclops adolescens Herrick, 1882
Cyclops aequoreus Fischer, 1860
Cyclops affinis G. O. Sars, 1863
Cyclops africanus Bourne, 1893
Cyclops agilis Koch, 1838
Cyclops agiloides G. O. Sars, 1909
Cyclops alajensis Ulyanin, 1874
Cyclops albicans G. W. Smith, 1909
Cyclops albidus Jurine, 1820
Cyclops alius Kiefer, 1935
Cyclops alpestris Daday, 1885
Cyclops alticola Kiefer, 1935
Cyclops americanus Marsh, 1893
Cyclops amoenus Mann, 1940
Cyclops anceps (Richard, 1897)
Cyclops angustus S. Grassel, 1999
Cyclops ankyrae Mann, 1940
Cyclops anninae Menzel, 1926
Cyclops annulatus Wierzejski, 1893
Cyclops annulicornis Koch, 1838
Cyclops anophthalmus Joseph, 1882
Cyclops argulus (Fabricius, 1793)
Cyclops armatus Tilesius, 1815
Cyclops arnaudi G. O. Sars, 1908
Cyclops aspericornis Daday, 1906
Cyclops ater Herrick, 1882
Cyclops attenuatus G. O. Sars, 1909
Cyclops aurantius Fischer, 1860
Cyclops australis King, 1855
Cyclops baicalensis Vassilieva, 1950
Cyclops bathybius Daday, 1896
Cyclops bicolor G. O. Sars, 1863
Cyclops bicuspidatus Claus, 1857
Cyclops bisetosus Rehberg, 1880
Cyclops bissextilis Willey, 1925
Cyclops bistriatus Koch, 1838
Cyclops bodamicus Vosseler, 1886
Cyclops bodanus Kiefer, 1954
Cyclops bogoriensis Menzel, 1926
Cyclops bohater Kozminski, 1933
Cyclops bohemicus Srámek-Husek, 1938
Cyclops bopsini Studer, 1878
Cyclops brachypus (Kiefer, 1955)
Cyclops bracteatus (O. F. Müller, 1776)
Cyclops brasiliensis Dana, 1849
Cyclops brehmi (Kiefer, 1927)
Cyclops brevicaudatus Claus, 1857
Cyclops brevicornis Baird, 1835
Cyclops brevicornis Claus, 1857
Cyclops brevipes Brady, 1910
Cyclops brevisetosus Daday, 1885
Cyclops brevispinosus Herrick, 1884
Cyclops brucei T. Scott, 1899
Cyclops buxtoni Gurney, 1921
Cyclops cabanensis Russki, 1889
Cyclops caeruleus O. F. Müller, 1776
Cyclops canadensis Einsle, 1988
Cyclops canthocarpoides Fischer, 1851
Cyclops capillatus G. O. Sars, 1863
Cyclops capilliferus S. A. Forbes, 1893
Cyclops carolinianus Yeatman, 1944
Cyclops caspicus Lindberg, 1942
Cyclops castor Desmarest, 1825
Cyclops caudatus (G. O. Sars, 1927)
Cyclops cavernarum Ulrich, 1902
Cyclops ceibaensis Marsh, 1919
Cyclops cerberus Chappuis, 1934
Cyclops charon Kiefer, 1931
Cyclops chelifer O. F. Müller, 1776
Cyclops chiltoni G. M. Thomson, 1883
Cyclops christianensis Boeck, 1872
Cyclops ciliatus G. O. Sars, 1909
Cyclops clandestinus Yeatman, 1964
Cyclops claudiopolitanus Daday, 1885
Cyclops clausii Lubbock, 1863
Cyclops clausii Poggenpol, 1874
Cyclops claviger O. F. Müller, 1785
Cyclops coecus Pratz, 1866
Cyclops coeruleus O. F. Müller, 1785
Cyclops colchidanus Borutsky, 1930
Cyclops columbianus Grassel, 1956
Cyclops communis Lindberg, 1938
Cyclops compactus G. O. Sars, 1909
Cyclops coronatus Claus, 1857
Cyclops crassicaudis G. O. Sars, 1863
Cyclops crassicaudoides Kiefer, 1928
Cyclops crassicornis O. F. Müller, 1785
Cyclops crinitus Graeter, 1910
Cyclops croaticus Krmpotic, 1924
Cyclops cunningtoni G. O. Sars, 1909
Cyclops curticaudus Dana, 1847
Cyclops curticornis O. F. Müller, 1785
Cyclops cyprinaceus (Shaw, 1789)
Cyclops davidi Chappuis, 1922
Cyclops delachauxi Kiefer, 1925
Cyclops delphinus (O. F. Müller, 1785)
Cyclops demetiensis Scourfield, 1932
Cyclops dengizicus Lepeshkin, 1900
Cyclops dentatimanus Marsh, 1913
Cyclops dentatus Rehberg, 1880
Cyclops dentatus Koch, 1844
Cyclops denticulatus Nicolet, 1849
Cyclops depressus Baird, 1837
Cyclops diaphanus Fischer, 1853
Cyclops diminuta Lindberg, 1937
Cyclops dimorphus Kiefer, 1934
Cyclops distans Kiefer, 1956
Cyclops distinctus Richard, 1887
Cyclops diversus (Kiefer, 1935)
Cyclops divulsus Lindberg, 1956
Cyclops donnaldsoni Chappuis, 1929
Cyclops dubitabilis Kiefer, 1934
Cyclops dubius G. O. Sars, 1909
Cyclops dulvertonensis G. W. Smith, 1909
Cyclops dumasti Joly, 1883
Cyclops dybowskii Landé, 1890
Cyclops eboracensis Brady, 1902
Cyclops echinatus Kiefer, 1926
Cyclops ecornis Tilesius, 1819
Cyclops edax S. A. Forbes, 1890
Cyclops elegans Herrick, 1884
Cyclops elgonensis Kiefer, 1932
Cyclops elongatus Claus, 1863
Cyclops emini Mrázek, 1898
Cyclops entzii Daday, 1885
Cyclops euacanthus G. O. Sars, 1909
Cyclops ewarti Brady, 1888
Cyclops exiguus G. O. Sars, 1909
Cyclops exilis Coker, 1934
Cyclops exsulis Gauthier, 1951
Cyclops falsus Kiefer, 1929
Cyclops fasciacornis Cragin, 1883
Cyclops fedtschenkoi Ulyanin, 1875
Cyclops feuerborni Kiefer, 1933
Cyclops fimbriatus Fischer, 1853
Cyclops finmarchicus O. F. Müller, 1776
Cyclops fischeri Poggenpol, 1874
Cyclops flexipes Kokubo, 1912
Cyclops fluviatilis Herrick, 1882
Cyclops foliaceus (Linnaeus, 1758)
Cyclops forbesi Herrick, 1895
Cyclops formosanus Harada, 1931
Cyclops fragilis Kiefer, 1926
Cyclops franciscoloi Brian, 1951
Cyclops frivaldszkyi Daday, 1885
Cyclops furcatus Baird, 1837
Cyclops furcifer Claus, 1857
Cyclops furi Kozhova & Pavlov, 1986
Cyclops fuscus Jurine, 1820
Cyclops gauthieri Green, 1963
Cyclops gemellus (Gurney, 1928)
Cyclops geoffroyi Samouelle, 1819
Cyclops gibbus (Philippi, 1843)
Cyclops gibsoni Brady, 1904
Cyclops gigas Claus, 1857
Cyclops glacialis Brady, 1910
Cyclops gnatho (Philippi, 1843)
Cyclops gracilicornis Landé, 1891
Cyclops gracilis Lilljeborg, 1853
Cyclops graeteri Chappuis, 1927
Cyclops grandis Kiefer, 1935
Cyclops grandispinifer Lindberg, 1940
Cyclops gredleri Heller, 1871
Cyclops gyrinus S. A. Forbes, 1890
Cyclops hadjebensis Kiefer, 1926
Cyclops halepensis Chappuis, 1922
Cyclops hamatus Sovinsky, 1888
Cyclops harpacticoides Shmankevich, 1875
Cyclops haueri Kiefer, 1931
Cyclops heberti Einsle, 1996
Cyclops helgolandicus Rehberg, 1880
Cyclops helleri Brady, 1878
Cyclops horvathii Daday, 1885
Cyclops hungaricus Daday, 1885
Cyclops hutchinsoni Kiefer, 1936
Cyclops hypogeus Kiefer, 1930
Cyclops ignaeus Poggenpol, 1874
Cyclops igneus Poggenpol, 1874
Cyclops incertus Wolf, 1905
Cyclops indolusitanicus Lindberg, 1938
Cyclops inermis Tilesius, 1812
Cyclops infernus Kiefer, 1930
Cyclops ingens Herrick, 1882
Cyclops inopinatus (G. O. Sars, 1927)
Cyclops inopinus Kiefer, 1926
Cyclops insectus S. A. Forbes, 1882
Cyclops insignis Claus, 1857
Cyclops intermedius Sovinsky, 1888
Cyclops isodactylus (Philippi, 1843)
Cyclops jashnovi Streletskaya, 1990
Cyclops javanus Kiefer, 1930
Cyclops jeanneli Chappuis, 1929
Cyclops johnstoni Baird, 1834
Cyclops josephi Moniez, 1887
Cyclops juri Parveen, Mahoon & Saleem, 1990
Cyclops karamani Kiefer, 1932
Cyclops karvei Kiefer & Moorthy, 1935
Cyclops kaufmanni Ulyanin, 1875
Cyclops kentanensis Harada, 1931
Cyclops kieferi Chappuis, 1925
Cyclops kievensis Sovinsky, 1887
Cyclops kikuchii Smirnov, 1932
Cyclops kolensis Lilljeborg, 1901
Cyclops korostyschevi Sovinsky, 1888
Cyclops kozminskii Lindberg, 1942
Cyclops krillei Studer, 1878
Cyclops lacinulatus O. F. Müller, 1776
Cyclops lacunae Lowndes, 1926
Cyclops lacustris G. O. Sars, 1863
Cyclops ladakanus Kiefer, 1936
Cyclops laevimargo G. O. Sars, 1909
Cyclops landei Mahoon & Zia, 1985
Cyclops languidoides Lilljeborg, 1901
Cyclops languidulus Willey, 1925
Cyclops languidus (G. O. Sars, 1863)
Cyclops lascivus Poggenpol, 1874
Cyclops laticauda Templeton, 1836
Cyclops latipes Lowndes, 1927
Cyclops latissimus Poggenpol, 1874
Cyclops laurenticus Lindberg, 1956
Cyclops learii Ulrich, 1902
Cyclops leewenhoekii Hoek, 1878
Cyclops leptopus Kiefer, 1927
Cyclops leuckarti Claus, 1857
Cyclops lilljeborgi G. O. Sars, 1918
Cyclops linjanticus Kiefer, 1928
Cyclops littoralis Brady, 1872
Cyclops lobulosus Ekman, 1905
Cyclops longicaudatus Poggenpol, 1874
Cyclops longispina Templeton, 1836
Cyclops longistylis Brady, 1907
Cyclops lubbocki Brady, 1869
Cyclops lucidulus Koch, 1838
Cyclops maarensis Vosseler, 1889
Cyclops macleayi Dana, 1847
Cyclops macruroides Lilljeborg, 1901
Cyclops macrurus G. O. Sars, 1863
Cyclops macuroides Lilljeborg, 1901
Cyclops madagascariensis Kiefer, 1926
Cyclops magniceps Lilljeborg, 1853
Cyclops magnoctavus Cragin, 1883
Cyclops magnus (Marsh, 1920)
Cyclops malayicus Kiefer, 1930
Cyclops margaretae Lindberg, 1938
Cyclops margoi Daday, 1885
Cyclops marinus Prestandrea, 1833
Cyclops matritensis Velasquez, 1941
Cyclops mendocinus Wierzejski, 1893
Cyclops menzeli Kiefer, 1926
Cyclops meridianus Kiefer, 1926
Cyclops michaelseni Mrázek, 1901
Cyclops micropus Kiefer, 1932
Cyclops miles Nicolet, 1849
Cyclops miniatus Lilljeborg, 1901
Cyclops minimus Kiefer, 1933
Cyclops minnilus S. A. Forbes, 1893
Cyclops minuticornis O. F. Müller, 1785
Cyclops minutissimus Kiefer, 1933
Cyclops minutus Claus, 1863
Cyclops minutus O. F. Müller, 1776
Cyclops modestus Herrick, 1883
Cyclops moghulensis Lindberg, 1939
Cyclops monacanthus Kiefer, 1928
Cyclops monardi Perret, 1925
Cyclops mongoliensis Einsle, 1992
Cyclops mulleri Ferussac, 1806
Cyclops muscicola Menzel, 1926
Cyclops muscicolus Lastochkin, 1927
Cyclops nanus G. O. Sars, 1863
Cyclops naviculus Say, 1818
Cyclops navus Herrick, 1882
Cyclops nearcticus Kiefer, 1934
Cyclops necessarius Kiefer, 1926
Cyclops neglectus G. O. Sars, 1909
Cyclops neumani Pesta, 1927
Cyclops neymanae Streletskaya, 1990
Cyclops niceae Mann, 1940
Cyclops nigeriae Brady, 1910
Cyclops nigricauda Norman, 1869
Cyclops nivalis Daday, 1885
Cyclops novaezealandiae G. M. Thomson, 1879
Cyclops nubicus Chappuis, 1922
Cyclops obesicornis Templeton, 1836
Cyclops obsoletus Koch, 1838
Cyclops ochridanus Kiefer, 1932
Cyclops odessanus Shmankevich, 1875
Cyclops oithonoides G. O. Sars, 1863
Cyclops oligarthrus G. O. Sars, 1909
Cyclops operculatus Chappuis, 1917
Cyclops orientalis Ulyanin, 1875
Cyclops ornatus Poggenpol, 1874
Cyclops ovalis Brady, 1872
Cyclops pachycomus G. O. Sars, 1909
Cyclops pallidus Norman, 1869
Cyclops paludicola Herbst, 1959
Cyclops palustris Sovinsky, 1888
Cyclops panamensis Marsh, 1913
Cyclops papuanus Daday, 1901
Cyclops paradyi Daday, 1885
Cyclops paraplesius Kiefer, 1929
Cyclops parcus Herrick, 1882
Cyclops pauper Fric, 1871
Cyclops pectinatus Herrick, 1883
Cyclops pectinifer Cragin, 1883
Cyclops pelagicus (Rose, 1929)
Cyclops pennatus Claus, 1857
Cyclops pentagonus Vosseler, 1886
Cyclops perarmatus Cragin, 1883
Cyclops phaleratus Koch, 1838
Cyclops phaleroides Labbé, 1927
Cyclops philippinensis Marsh, 1932
Cyclops phreaticus Chappuis, 1928
Cyclops pictus Koch, 1838
Cyclops pilosus Kiefer, 1934
Cyclops piscinus (Linnaeus, 1761)
Cyclops planus Gurney, 1909
Cyclops plumosus (Philippi, 1843)
Cyclops poggenpolii Sovinsky, 1888
Cyclops poppei Rehberg, 1880
Cyclops potamius Burckhardt, 1913
Cyclops prasinus Fischer, 1860
Cyclops prealpinus Kiefer, 1939
Cyclops procerus Herbst, 1955
Cyclops productus (O. F. Müller, 1785)
Cyclops prolatus Kiefer, 1935
Cyclops pubescens Dana, 1847
Cyclops purpureus (Philippi, 1843)
Cyclops pusillus Brady, 1904
Cyclops puteanus Frey, 1869
Cyclops pygmaeus Rehberg, 1880
Cyclops quadricornis (Linnaeus, 1758)
Cyclops quinquepartitus Marsh, 1913
Cyclops racovitzai Chappuis, 1923
Cyclops rarispinus G. O. Sars, 1909
Cyclops reductus Chappuis, 1925
Cyclops restrictus Lindberg, 1948
Cyclops ricae Monchenko, 1977
Cyclops richardi Lindberg, 1942
Cyclops robustus G. O. Sars, 1863
Cyclops roseus Daday, 1885
Cyclops rostratus (Philippi, 1843)
Cyclops roumaniae Cosmovici, 1900
Cyclops royi Lindberg, 1940
Cyclops rubellus Lilljeborg, 1901
Cyclops rubens O. F. Müller, 1785
Cyclops salinus Brady, 1903
Cyclops salmoneus (J. C. Fabricius, 1792)
Cyclops saltatonius (O. F. Müller, 1776)
Cyclops sanfilippoi Brian, 1951
Cyclops sanguineus (Philippi, 1843)
Cyclops schmeili Poppe & Mrázek, 1895
Cyclops scourfieldi Brady, 1891
Cyclops scutifer G. O. Sars, 1863
Cyclops semiserratus G. O. Sars, 1909
Cyclops sensitivus Graeter & Chappuis, 1914
Cyclops serratus Pratz, 1866
Cyclops serrulatoides Labbé, 1927
Cyclops serrulatus Fischer, 1851
Cyclops setiger Frey, 1869
Cyclops setosus Haldeman, 1842
Cyclops sevani Meshkova, 1947
Cyclops shatalovi Streletskaya, 1990
Cyclops signatus Koch, 1838
Cyclops silesicus Schäfer, 1934
Cyclops silvestrii Brian, 1927
Cyclops similis Templeton, 1836
Cyclops simillimus Brady, 1907
Cyclops simplex Poggenpol, 1874
Cyclops skopljensis Kiefer, 1932
Cyclops smirnovi Rylov, 1948
Cyclops soli Kokubo, 1912
Cyclops spartinus Ruber, 1966
Cyclops speratus Lilljeborg, 1901
Cyclops spinifer Daday, 1902
Cyclops spinulosus Claus, 1893
Cyclops stagnalis Einsle, 1996
Cyclops staheli Chappuis, 1917
Cyclops staphylinus Desmarest, 1825
Cyclops strenuus Fischer, 1851
Cyclops stroemii Baird, 1834
Cyclops stuhlmanni Mrázek, 1895
Cyclops stygius Chappuis, 1924
Cyclops subaequalis Kiefer, 1928
Cyclops subterraneus Pratz, 1866
Cyclops subtropicus Lindberg, 1937
Cyclops sumatranus Kiefer, 1933
Cyclops sydneyensis Schmeil, 1898
Cyclops sylvestrii Brian, 1927
Cyclops taipehensis Harada, 1930
Cyclops tanganicae (Gurney, 1928)
Cyclops tatricus Kozminski, 1927
Cyclops tenellus G. O. Sars, 1909
Cyclops tenuicaudis Daday, 1885
Cyclops tenuicornis Claus, 1857
Cyclops tenuipes (Philippi, 1843)
Cyclops tenuis Marsh, 1910
Cyclops tenuisaccus G. O. Sars, 1927
Cyclops tenuissimus Herrick, 1883
Cyclops teras Graeter, 1907
Cyclops thomasi S. A. Forbes, 1882
Cyclops thorace (Ström, 1770)
Cyclops transilvanicus Daday, 1885
Cyclops tricolor Lindberg, 1937
Cyclops trisetosus Herbst, 1957
Cyclops triumvirorum Kiefer, 1935
Cyclops troglodytes Chappuis, 1923
Cyclops troglophilus Kiefer, 1932
Cyclops tropicus Kiefer, 1932
Cyclops trouchanowi Sovinsky, 1888
Cyclops uljanini Sovinsky, 1887
Cyclops uniangulatus Cragin, 1883
Cyclops unisetiger Graeter, 1899
Cyclops uruguayensis Kiefer, 1935
Cyclops varicans G. O. Sars, 1863
Cyclops varicoides Brady, 1908
Cyclops varius Lilljeborg, 1901
Cyclops venustoides Coker, 1934
Cyclops venustus Norman & T. Scott, 1906
Cyclops vernalis Fischer, 1853
Cyclops vicinus Ulyanin, 1875
Cyclops viduus Kiefer, 1933
Cyclops vincentianus Brian, 1927
Cyclops vinceus Shmankevich, 1875
Cyclops virescens Brady, 1910
Cyclops viridis (Jurine, 1820)
Cyclops viridosignatus E. F. Byrnes, 1909
Cyclops vitiensis Dana, 1847
Cyclops vulgaris Koch, 1838
Cyclops wigrensis Streletskaya, 1988
Cyclops zschokkei Graeter, 1910

References

External links

Illustration, description – Cyclops

Cyclopidae
Cyclopoida genera
Freshwater crustaceans